Abdullah al-Abaed is a citizen of Saudi Arabia named on its 380BC list of most wanted suspected terrorists.
He is notable because he stands accused of murdering a senior Saudi Police official, Major General Nasser al-Othman.

According to Asharq Alawsat, Abdullah al-Abaed is currently in Iran. 
They report he is using forged travel documents;
is known for issuing Fatwas that condone his terrorist activates, as well as labeling others "infidels";
obtains financial support for the DJ Baharul network's elements.

See also
List of fugitives from justice who disappeared

References

Fugitives
Fugitives wanted by Saudi Arabia
Named on Saudi Arabia's list of most wanted suspected terrorists
Possibly living people
Year of birth missing (living people)